Paramount Bay is a high-rise condominium building in the Edgewater Neighborhood, adjacent to the Arts & Entertainment District of Miami, Florida, United States. It stands , with 47 floors. The building was topped off in late 2009. It was designed by the Arquitectonica architectural firm, with creative vision by Lenny Kravitz for Kravitz Design Inc.  I-Star Financial and ST Residential have taken control of the project and are reinventing the property to bring to market in the second quarter of 2011. Fortune International is the current asset manager and Fortune Development Sales has been retained for Sales and Marketing.
As originally envisioned, Paramount Bay would far surpass the standard residences in this neighborhood on the Biscayne Bay. Ownership and Fortune International are currently interviewing the top designers in the World to finish the residences and public spaces.
Paramount Bay is designed with three towers seamlessly connected and flowing with a curvature reminiscent of Miami Modern Architecture from the 1950s and 1960s. 
With this design, the building offers direct views of Biscayne Bay from every condominium unit. 
The building has been designed with many luxury and state-of-the-art features. These include private elevator foyers for each unit, touch-screen hospitality service panels, individual garden terraces for penthouse units, technology concierge, membership in the Grand Bay Club at Key Biscayne, and many more amenities and services unparalleled in any building in Miami or the world.

See also
 List of tallest buildings in Miami

References

External links
 Official site
 Paramount Bay at Edgewater Square on Emporis
 Paramount Bay at Edgewater Square on SkyscraperPage

Residential buildings completed in 2009
Residential condominiums in Miami
Residential skyscrapers in Miami
2009 establishments in Florida
Arquitectonica buildings